The white-eyed imperial pigeon has been split into two species:
 Spectacled imperial pigeon,  Ducula perspicillata
 Seram imperial pigeon, 	Ducula neglecta